Alexander Paul Charrier McKee OBE (25 July 1918 – 22 July 1992) was a British journalist, military historian, and diver who published nearly thirty books.

Life
McKee was educated mostly by a series of governesses, from whom he acquired an acute eye for the quality of evidence. However, his lack of paper qualifications was to prove a serious hindrance to his later career. The most unusual thing he did in his youth was to fly solo at the age of fifteen.

In the Second World War, McKee served in the British Army and wrote war poetry. After the War he served with the British Army on the Rhine (BAOR). He wrote articles for the BAOR newspaper Polar Bear News and became a writer and producer for the British Forces Network in Germany.

After demobilization, McKee became the editor of Conveyor magazine and wrote plays for BBC radio. Among many other subjects, his plays covered Trotsky's assassination, Dr Semmelweiss's campaign to get modern standards of hygiene adopted in hospitals across Europe, and the "mad" monk Rasputin odd story and seemingly hypnotic influence on the Russian Imperial Family.

Next, McKee decided to concentrate on documentary authorship, publishing some 27 books during his life. In between researching and writing books, McKee took up sub-aqua diving with the Southsea Branch of the British Sub-Aqua Club. His projects got the branch voted the most interesting in the United Kingdom three years running. Next, he drove forward the discussed but unauctioned project to search for King Henry VIII flagship Mary Rose. From about 1965 onwards, he was concentrating most of his efforts on the Mary Rose project. For finding the Mary Rose, he was appointed an Officer of the Order of the British Empire.

McKee published King Henry VIII's Mary Rose in 1973. It was the first book about the Mary Rose project by nearly a decade, so it could be regarded as a seminal work. His vision already detailed most of what later became reality, even to the opening of the new Mary Rose Museum, and much of what he wrote is reiterated in publications by later authors.

In contrast, McKee's more frequently referenced book How We Found the Mary Rose was published as late as 1982, nearly a decade later. Although a human interest work, it includes many excerpts from the diving logs of his original diving teams from Project Solent Ships and MRSB0551: hence the "We" in the book title. He targeted these two books specifically on the Mary Rose. He also provides summaries of his Mary Rose research in some of his other books.

Bibliography 
Against the Odds: Battles at Sea 1591-1949
A Heritage of Ships
A World Too Vast: the Four Voyages of Christopher Columbus
Black Saturday
Caen: Anvil of Victory (Last round against Rommel)
Death Raft: the Wreck of the Medusa
Dresden 1945: the Devil`s Tinderbox
El Alamein: Ultra and the Three Battles
Farming the Sea
From Merciless Invaders
Gordon of Khartoum (published under the pseudonym Paul Charrier)
History under the Sea
1982: How We Found the Mary Rose
H.M.S. Bounty
Ice Crash
Into the Blue (Great Mysteries of Aviation)
King Henry VIII's Mary Rose
Race for the Rhine Bridges
Strike from the Sky
Tarquin`s Ship: the Etruscan Wreck in Campese Bay
The Coal Scuttle Brigade
The Friendless Sky (the Flying Aces: Sagas of the Incredible War in the Air 1914 – 1918)
1961: 
The Mosquito Log
The Queen`s Corsair
Vimy Ridge

References 

Peter Marsden, Alexander McKee (obituary) from The Independent, online at independent.co.uk

External links
 The Papers of Alexander McKee at Dartmouth College Library

1918 births
1992 deaths
British military historians
British Army officers
British Army personnel of World War II
Officers of the Order of the British Empire
20th-century British historians